The 2005 Chrono des Herbiers was the 24th edition of the Chrono des Nations cycle race and was held on 16 October 2005. The race started and finished in Les Herbiers. The race was won by Ondřej Sosenka.

General classification

References

2005
2005 in road cycling
2005 in French sport
October 2005 sports events in France